Brooklyn is a town in Clay Township, Morgan County, in the U.S. state of Indiana. The population was 1,598 at the 2010 census.

History
Brooklyn was laid out in 1854, at about the time the railroad was extended to that point. The town probably took its name after Brooklyn, New York. A post office has been in operation at Brooklyn since 1856.

The Franklin Landers-Black and Adams Farm was listed on the National Register of Historic Places in 2000.

Geography
Brooklyn is located at  (39.541391, -86.370021).

Demographics

2010 census
As of the 2010 census, there were 1,598 people, 580 households, and 455 families living in the town. The racial makeup of the town was 97.8% White, 0.2% African American, 0.4% Native American, 0.2% Asian, 0.7% from other races, and 0.8% from two or more races. Hispanic or Latino of any race were 1.8% of the population.

There were 580 households, of which 40.3% had children under the age of 18 living with them, 58.4% were married couples living together, 15.2% had a female householder with no husband present, 4.8% had a male householder with no wife present, and 21.6% were non-families. 16.9% of all households were made up of individuals, and 5.5% had someone living alone who was 65 years of age or older. The average household size was 2.76 and the average family size was 3.05.

The median age in the town was 34.7 years. 28.1% of residents were under the age of 18; 8.5% were between the ages of 18 and 24; 26.5% were from 25 to 44; 25.8% were from 45 to 64; and 11% were 65 years of age or older. The gender makeup of the town was 50.4% male and 49.6% female.

2000 census
As of the 2000 census, there were 1,545 people, 553 households, and 435 families living in the town. The racial makeup of the town was 96.70% White, 0.39% Native American, 0.06% Asian, 0.06% from other races, and 2.78% from two or more races. Hispanic or Latino of any race were 1.04% of the population.

There were 553 households, out of which 40.7% had children under the age of 18 living with them, 62.9% were married couples living together, 11.0% had a female householder with no husband present, and 21.3% were non-families. 17.5% of all households were made up of individuals, and 6.5% had someone living alone who was 65 years of age or older. The average household size was 2.79 and the average family size was 3.11.

In the town, the population was spread out, with 30.3% under the age of 18, 8.2% from 18 to 24, 35.8% from 25 to 44, 18.7% from 45 to 64, and 7.1% who were 65 years of age or older. The median age was 32 years. For every 100 females, there were 107.4 males. For every 100 females age 18 and over, there were 103.6 males.

The median income for a household in the town was $42,880, and the median income for a family was $44,563. Males had a median income of $35,292 versus $25,303 for females. The per capita income for the town was $18,242. About 8.2% of families and 9.5% of the population were below the poverty line, including 14.2% of those under age 18 and 10.7% of those age 65 or over.

Education
Grade school students attend Brooklyn Elementary STEM Academy, a part of the MSD of Martinsville.  Students from Brooklyn attend Bell Intermediate Academy, John R. Wooden Middle School and Martinsville High School in Martinsville, Indiana

Brooklyn has a public library, a branch of the Morgan County Public Library.

Arts and culture
The Goethe Link Observatory is a mile or two west of town on Observatory Road.  The Observatory grounds are noted for the large collection of daffodils assembled by Dr. Link's wife.

References

Towns in Morgan County, Indiana
Towns in Indiana
Indianapolis metropolitan area